Hyperlais rosseti is a species of moth in the family Crambidae described by Thierry Varenne in 2009. It is endemic to France.

References

Moths described in 2009
Cybalomiinae
Moths of Europe